Amelia is the debut studio album by British singer and songwriter Mimi Webb, released on 3 March 2023 through Epic Records. It was preceded by the singles "House on Fire", "Ghost of You" and "Red Flags", while "Freezing" was released the same date as the album. A week after the album's release, Webb began the Amelia Tour, visiting the UK and Europe.

Background
Webb worked on the album for three years and called it "the best version of me" and asked listeners "to accept vulnerability without judgement while you listen to this record". Amelia is named for Webb's full first name, with Webb stating that there are "two sides" of her that she wants "people to get to know [...] Amelia, the girl from the UK countryside who loves to be at home with her family, friends, and dogs; and Mimi, the pop artist who loves to be up on stage traveling the world". Webb announced the album on 12 October 2022, following the release of the second single "Ghost of You".

Critical reception

Amelia received a score of 70 out of 100 on review aggregator Metacritic based on four critics' reviews, indicating "generally favorable" reception. Otis Robinson of DIY called Amelia a "dependable, invigorating debut (chock full of unforgettable earworms) and its strengths lie in its biggest moments: particularly, those with clear Scandipop influences, like the Dagny-esque 'Freezing' and Sigrid-like, bubble-gummy 'Ghost of You'". Bethan Eyre of The Line of Best Fit described the album as "jam packed with tracks soon to be on everyone's pre-drinks playlist come the weekend", finding that "although it may be straightforward, quintessential pop music, it is catchy quintessential pop music done well". Ben Devlin, reviewing the album for musicOMH, felt that Amelia "isn't a concept record in the slightest, instead it's 12 pristinely-written tunes, eight of which are about break-ups (another two about rocky relationships) and despite the personal implications of the album's title these lyrics are defiantly general", also calling Webb "certainly a pleasant singer, her voice sounding like a less babyish Tate McRae". Devlin concluded that the album "knows what it wants to do and pursues this with relentless efficiency". Kathleen Johnston, writing for The Daily Telegraph called all of the songs "undeniably well-made and catchy" but opined that the album "veers into all-too predictable territory in places, such as with 'Is it Possible'".

Track listing

Note
  signifies a co-producer

Personnel
Musicians
 Mimi Webb – vocals
 Dave Kutch – mastering
 Manny Marroquin – mixing (1–6)
 Connor McDonough – mixing (7), engineering (2, 3)
 Ryan Daly – mixing (7), engineering (2, 3)
 Rob Kinelski – mixing (9)
 Kevin "KD" Davis – mixing (10–12)
 Andrew Wells – engineering (1)
 The Nocturns – engineering (4, 6)
 Lostboy – engineering (5, 10)
 David Stewart – engineering (9)
 Louis Schoorl – engineering (11)
 Nick Gale – engineering (12)
 Adam Blake – keyboards (8)
 Stuart Price – keyboards, programming (8)
 Anthony Vilchis – engineering assistance (1–6)
 Trey Station – engineering assistance (1–6)
 Zach Pereyra – engineering assistance (1–6)
 Eli Heisler – engineering assistance (9)

Charts

Release history

References

2023 debut albums
Albums produced by Cirkut
Albums produced by Stuart Price
Epic Records albums
Mimi Webb albums